Hammond Allan Furlonge (born June 19, 1934) is a former cricketer who played in three Tests for the West Indies between 1955 and 1956.

Cricket career
Furlonge made his first-class debut for Trinidad in 1954-55, opening the batting with Jeff Stollmeyer. In his third match, against the touring Australians, he scored 57 and 150 not out. He was included in the team for the Fifth Test, opening with John Holt, and making 4 and 28.

He toured New Zealand with the West Indies team in 1955-56. He failed to score in the Second Test, but returned for the Fourth Test when he top-scored in the first innings with 64 in a total of 145 all out in a low-scoring match, New Zealand's first Test victory. Dick Brittenden said of this innings that Furlonge's "accentuated two-eyed stance should have made him especially vulnerable to the seamers, but he played with skill and a stout heart for 210 minutes".

He played a few more matches for Trinidad over the next six seasons, scoring 106 and 45 against Barbados in 1960-61 (his only game as captain), and played his last first-class match in 1961-62.

His brothers Carl and Kenneth also played for Trinidad. The one match they all played together was the one against Barbados when Hammond captained the side.

References

External links
 Hammond Furlonge at Cricket Archive
 Hammond Furlonge at Cricinfo

1934 births
Living people
West Indies Test cricketers
Trinidad and Tobago cricketers
North Trinidad cricketers